The 1973 Virginia Cavaliers football team represented the University of Virginia during the 1973 NCAA Division I football season. The Cavaliers were led by third-year head coach Don Lawrence and played their home games at Scott Stadium in Charlottesville, Virginia. They competed as members of the Atlantic Coast Conference, finishing in fourth. Lawrence was fired as head coach following the end of the season. He had a record of 11–22 at Virginia.

Schedule

Personnel

References

Virginia
Virginia Cavaliers football seasons
Virginia Cavaliers football